Choice Airways is an American charter airline based in Fort Lauderdale, Florida.

History 
The airline was established on March 27, 2009 and started its operations using Metroliner III's.

In December 2014, the airline sponsored a toy drive to an orphanage in Haiti.

Fleet

As of December 2014, the Choice Airways fleet consists of the following aircraft:

References

External links
 

American companies established in 1990
Airlines established in 1990
1990 establishments in Florida
Companies based in Broward County, Florida
Airlines based in Florida
Charter airlines of the United States